Kiranpal Pannu (born 7 January 1997) is a tennis player from New Zealand.

Pannu has a career-high singles ranking by the Association of Tennis Professionals (ATP) of 575, achieved on 2 January 2023. He also has a career-high ATP doubles ranking of 1019, achieved on 9 January 2023.

Pannu represents New Zealand in Davis Cup competitions, where he has a win-loss record of 0–1.

Pannu made his ATP tour debut in Auckland in 2023. He lost to Richard Gasquet in straight sets in the first round.

ATP Challenger and ITF Futures finals

Singles: 1 (1–0)

References

External links
 
 
 

1997 births
Living people
New Zealand male tennis players
Sportspeople from Wellington City
New Zealand sportspeople of Indian descent
21st-century New Zealand people